The Thief and the Dogs (al-liṣ wal-kilāb) is one of the Egyptian author Naguib Mahfouz's most celebrated works. He further developed his theme of existentialism using stream-of-consciousness and surrealist techniques  It charts the life of Said Mahran, a thief recently released from jail and intent on having his vengeance on the people who put him there. The novel was published in 1961, and Said's despair reflects disappointment in revolution and new order in Egypt—as Said is not only a thief, but a kind of revolutionary anarchist.

Plot summary

Said's world revolves around Nabawiyya, his former wife, and Sana', his daughter. Once in love with the former, she has now betrayed him by marrying his friend 'Ilish. Central to the making of Said Mahran is also Ra'uf 'Ilwan, his one-time criminal mentor, who used the same revolutionist rhetoric, but now, being a respected journalist and businessman, is in seeming opposition to Said, whose outlook hasn't changed. These perceived betrayals throw the protagonist into the utmost confusion and his initial calculation in revenge becomes ever more a wild flailing against the whole world. Only Nur, a prostitute, and Tarzan, a café-owner, provide Said with any aid and support from the world at large which is closing in on him, yet in time even they cannot help him.

Characters in "The Thief and the Dogs"
Said Mahran; the main character
Rauf Ilwan; Mahran's erstwhile mentor
Nabawiyya; Mahran's former wife, currently married to Illish
Sana; Mahran's biological daughter
Ilish Sidra; Mahran's friend until he betrays Said (currently married to Nabawiyya)
Nur; a prostitute who loves Said
Tarzan; a café-owner
Sheikh: cleric, of shehab brotherhood Said's father had been a member and to whom Said turns for spiritual guidance

Major themes
Heavily dependent on imagery, the thief, Said, is depicted as a tragic hero being  Rady chased down by those he perceives as dogs. The recurring images of prison, betrayal and darkness amongst others also permeate the text. The novel is remarkable because it is the first novel to employ the stream of consciousness style of writing in Arabic. It helped, therefore, to confirm Mahfouz's stature as a pioneer in the field of literature.

Adaptations
The novel was adapted into a film and a television series in Egypt. The film was first released in 1962, only one year after the novel was first published, with a screenplay by Salah Jahin. The film starred Shoukry Sarhan (Said), Kamal el-Shennawi, and Shadia (Nur). The television series was released in 1975, and lasted only one season (13 episodes). Although it was an Egyptian series, it was produced by a Dubai-based television station.

References

 Nobel Prize in Literature 1988: Naguib Mahfouz

1961 novels
Egyptian novels adapted into films
Novels by Naguib Mahfouz
Novels set in Egypt